Major (born January 17, 2018) is a German Shepherd formerly owned by Joe Biden's family. Major, who was born in 2018, is the first shelter dog to live in the White House. Previously, President John F. Kennedy and his wife Jackie had also owned two German Shepherds. 

Major was a rescue from a litter that had been exposed to "something toxic" in their home, and their owner was unable to afford the expense of veterinary care for them. He was fostered by the Bidens earlier that year from the Delaware Humane Association's shelter and has been with them since late 2018. On the day Joe Biden adopted the dog from the shelter, he stayed "telling stories and taking selfies with staffers" for over an hour. The origin of Major's name is not publicly known, but Beau Biden, Joe Biden's son, was a major in the Delaware National Guard.

Incidents 
On November 28, 2020, then-President-elect Biden fractured his foot while playing with Major. Biden said in an interview that Major was waiting to play after the president-elect emerged from a shower: "I'm joking, running after him and grab his tail. And what happened was that he slid on a throw rug. And I tripped on the rug he slid on."
On March 8, 2021, Major and Champ (Biden's other German shepherd) were temporarily moved to live with a family friend in Delaware after a minor incident in which Major nipped a security guard. Major has been known for displaying agitated behavior on multiple occasions, in the past including "jumping, barking, and charging" at staff and security. Joe Biden noted in an interview that the bite did not penetrate the skin. They returned to the White House on March 24 after Major received some training, including training on how to live with a future cat that the Bidens adopted in the White House. On March 30, Major was involved in a second biting incident at the White House, having bitten a National Park Service employee during a walk. 

Major is not the first presidential dog to have biting incidents. In separate incidents, Franklin D. Roosevelt's dog Major (who was also a German Shepherd) bit United States Senator Hattie Wyatt Caraway, and attacked Prime Minister of the United Kingdom Ramsay MacDonald, tearing MacDonald's pants off. Theodore Roosevelt's bull terrier Pete bit numerous people, even tearing the pants off of ambassador of France to the United States Jean Jules Jusserand.

Political activities
In July 2020, Biden's granddaughter, Naomi, posted a tweet showcasing Champ and Major fighting over a Donald Trump chew toy. Though the tweet was subsequently deleted, the photo resurfaced on social media before the 2020 United States presidential election.

Champ and Major both appeared in advertisements for Biden in his 2020 presidential campaign against President Donald Trump who had no pets in the White House. During the campaign Biden tweeted that "Some Americans celebrate #NationalCatDay, some celebrate #NationalDogDay...President Trump celebrates neither. It says a lot. It's time we put a pet back in the White House."

Three days before the inauguration of Joe Biden, the Delaware Humane Association held an "indoguration" for Major. More than 7,400 people attended via Zoom and it featured a performance by Josh Groban. The event also raised $200,000 in donations for the association.

Departure from the White House 
In December 2021, on the day the Bidens announced a new puppy, Commander, was to move into the White House, it was also announced that Major would no longer be a resident there after experts recommended that it would be safer for him to live in a quieter environment with family friends.

Gallery

See also
 List of individual dogs
 United States presidential pets

References 

Biden family
German shepherds
United States presidential dogs
2018 animal births